Dia is a Torricelli language of Papua New Guinea. Both Dia and the closely related Sinagen language go by the names Alu and Galu.

References

External links 
 Paradisec holds an open access collection of Dia recordings, including lexical items, verb paradigms, stories, cry-singing and remarks.
 Paradisec also houses a collection of Arthur Capell's materials that include Dia (AC2), and notebooks from Don Laycock (DL2) that also. Both of these collections are open access.

Wapei languages
Languages of Sandaun Province